Apex is an unincorporated community in Lincoln County, in the U.S. state of Missouri.

History
Apex had its start as a station on the Chicago, Burlington, and Quincy Railroad.  A post office called Apex was established in 1880, and remained in operation until 1941. 

In 1925, Apex had 28 inhabitants. Little remains of the original community.

References

Unincorporated communities in Lincoln County, Missouri
Unincorporated communities in Missouri